DMDS may refer to:

 De Mysteriis Dom Sathanas, an album by the Norwegian black metal band Mayhem
 Defense Manpower Data Center, a part of the United States Department of Defense
 Dimethyl disulfide, a chemical compound